in Japan are vocational education institutions for short and long term programs, a group of public human resources development facilities under paragraph (1) (i) of Article 15-6 of the Human Resources Development Promotion Law. It involves designated private sector as well.

Categories
There are several types of facilities providing public vocational training in Japan. There are mainly two administrating offices at state level, the Ministry of Health, Labour, and Welfare (MHLW) and the Ministry of Education, Culture, Sports, Science and Technology (MEXT).

There are four operators of those MHLW administered vocational training facilities; Cities and municipalities (towns and villages), prefectures, the Japan Organization for Employment of the Elderly, Persons with Disabilities and Job Seekers (JEED) and the state. Types of educational facilities include Polytechnic Schools, Polytechnic Colleges, Polytechnic Universities, Polytechnic Centers, and Polytechnic Schools for Persons with Disabilities. They serve for different groups of people wishing to obtain vocational skills.

Polytechnic Schools admit the youngest group of applicants as graduates of junior high and high schools. General unemployed and employed are studying with them, too. Cities and municipalities run one facility, and there were 156 prefectures operated, both statistics of 2013.

At Polytechnic Colleges, high school graduates are required to have finished specialized programs before admission, as advanced vocational training is provided. Opeators are both JEED for one college and prefectures for 13 as of 2013.

JEED is the sole operator for Polytechnic Universities, totaled to 10 in 2013. Those universities offer vocational training as "the professional course" for those who have finished advanced special programs, either they are high school graduates or adults. High school graduates are offered 2,800 hours in two-year program. Tuition was JPY390,000 in 2012, on top of the entrance fee of JPY169,200. Those who finished the professional course can apply for "the advanced course", which they will finish in two –years' term, with entrance fee of JPY112,800 on top of tuition of JPY390,000.

There were 61 Polytechnic Centers JEED also operated in 2013, where they admit both unemployed and employed for short-term courses. Junior high and high school graduates gain professional skills in general course, in minimum 2,800 hours in two years, and 1,400 hours in one year. The prefectures budget and designate the fee of enrollment.

Persons with disabilities are admitted to state accredited Polytechnic Schools for Persons with Disabilities, as of 2013 totaled to 13. The operation of two facilities appointed JEED, and prefectures were responsible to run 11. Aside from those 13, prefectures also managed 6 in the same year.

Job placement centers called Hello Work consult unemployed to promote themselves at job interviews and encourage them to apply for short term vocational training, offered by JEED for six month and by prefectures for six-to-12 months. 41,228 trainee admitted to those facilities and short term courses in FY 2012, while average of 80.8% of them were employed by the end of the fiscal year. There are contracted job training institutions, where 3 months' courses are offered to the unemployed without tuition and up to 300 hours of training.

Administrator
In the strict definition of polytechnic schools, prefectures of Japan shall administer, Municipalities of Japan can establish them, but neither the Stare of Japan, Independent Administrative Institution, nor 
JEED   is among those to administer those tasks.

On the other hand, private entities supporting job seekers can install a vocational training facility for such accredited programs, as long as governors of prefectures authorize  when such entities fulfill the criteria of ordinance of the Ministry of Health, Labour, and Welfare in Japan. In that case, with the exception of the restriction of the use of such public facilities names, it is allowed to name such facility a vocational skills development school.

Japan's human resources development policy
Among the departments of Ministry of Health, Labour and Welfare (MHLW), Human Resources Development Bureau is in charge of vocational training as defined in "The mission, realizing social development through individual skills development" policy in Reference section,  for the fiscal year 2016 (Heisei 28). The Bureau focused on  vocational training programs for human resource to train skills and give knowledge, to answer as well as sustain the manufacturing industry, a leading industry in Japan.
The Bureau also expanded the focus on supplying productive labour forces as defined in "Policy Information—Human Resources Development." for those markets with expected intensive demands in the care and welfare for elderly and young children, as well as for intelligence technology.

Structure and Measures

The government of Japan and Ministry of Health, Labour, and Welfare overviewed the administration of human resources development in "the 8th Basic Plan for Human Resources Development", which was updated to "the 9th Basic Plan for Human Resources Development".

The implement was divided roughly into three categories; "Developing and improvement of vocational abilities," "Vocational ability evaluation and promotion of trade skills" with "International cooperation". The Bureau surveys human resources development measured by fiscal year.

Information on the policy is presented in detail as chapter 6, Structure of Human Resources Development Measures, and seven measures to implement the plan for:
Overview of HRD Administration
Vocational Training 
Support for the working career formation
Provision against young people
Job Card System 
Vocational ability evaluation and promoting trade skills 
Technical Intern Training Program and 8 International cooperation

Certificate systems for skills 
While graduates of vocational schools/colleges will receive graduation certificates, there is not a full system to issue them diploma which both Semmonshi and kōdo-Semmonshi are given as academic degree. In May 1963 when they selected national team to attend the 12th WorldSkills Competition  in Ireland, the first National Skills Competition of Japan was head in Tokyo by MHLW. The competitors are nominated through local chapters of the Vocational Ability Development Association and other recommenders, who are 23 years old or younger. As of 2017, entrants will compete with their skills in six categories, and the results are hoped to appeal their ability and excellence to those industries for machine, metal working, electronics, construction, service and fashion, and IT.

The competition had been held in Tokyo and Chiba prefecture till 1990, and since 1991 and the 29th competition, Aichi prefecture  became the host for the event  co-sponsored by the local government and the Japan Vocational Ability Development Association (JAVADA), a Special Civil Corporation under the jurisdiction of Human Resources Development Bureau (MHLW). Later on, the regulation changed to involve other prefectures as the host.  
The year before the international competition, the national competition is doubled to top the selection procedures for the national team.

Youth under 20 years of age are eligible to enter two separate national competitions. The first is Youth Competition for Monozukuri, also sponsored by JAVADA since August 2005. The second is open for a student at a technical high school and the upper secondary school, specialized course (:ja:専門高等学校 senmon kōtō gakkō) in their own national monozukuri contest for high school students, nicknamed Koshien for Work skills, organized by the National Association of Principals of Technical Senior High Schools under the jurisdiction of MEXT (Ministry of Education, Culture, Sports, Science and Technology). Those studying at standard high schools with integrated course (:ja:総合学科 sōgō gakka) are also invited to enter at that competition.

For physically handicapped students, they have the Abilympics, or the Ability Olympics (:ja:全国障害者技能競技大会 Zenkoku shōgaisha ginō kyōgi taikai) sponsored by the Japan Organization for Employment of the Elderly, Persons with Disabilities and Job Seekers (JEED).
There are chances to proceed and participate in the International Abilympics (IA) every four year organized by the International Abilympic Federation.

MHLW sets a policy to "visualize graduates' abilities" with the National Trade Skills Testing System for Shokugyo kaihatsu gakko graduates aiming the manufacturing industry. Those aiming at service industries including fashion, hair dressing and curinary business, they will take national tests and receive certificates as a proof of their skills in each profession. Model cases have been sought since 2013, for example sales staff in retail sectors as in major department stores. Another challenge for the MLHW to target is to provide instructors for education services at private preparatory schools, and the scheme was expected to start in the following fiscal years.

Diploma for vocational skills 
To contrast, the doplima system of Japan, or an academic degree, is governed by the Ministry of Education, Culture, Sports, Science and Technology, aiming originally to improve the reputation of a vocational school graduate, and to promote lifelong learning. Diploma will be issued to those who had completed a particular specialized course successfully designed for two years' study. A vocational school, or one that Ministry categorises either a "Semmon-gakkō" (専門学校) which means a "professional training college, post-secondary course", and a "Senshū-gakkō" (専修学校), a "specialized training college, general course".  Sōichi Tanaka, then the head of the Lifelong Learning Policy Bureau (Shōgai gakushū seisaku-kyoku), MEXT, sealed and published the Act 17-349 on 9 September 2005 to Mayors, the heads of Board of Education in each prefecture, as well as the presidents of national universities offering Senshu gakkō (.).

History

 1947 – Employment Security Law was enacted, and vocational training center was defined in Article 27.
 1949 – Employment Security Law revised to publicize vocational training centers.
 1958 – Employment Security Law (1958) was enacted, and the general vocational training center was defined in Article 5.
 1969 –  Vocational Training Law was enacted, and the special vocational training school was defined in Article 15. Prefectures of Japan were able to set up advanced vocational training schools as defined in Article 16.
 1978 – Vocational Training Law was revised, and special vocational training school and advanced vocational training school was turned into vocational training school as defined in paragraph (1) of Article 14.
 1993 – Vocational training school became Polytechnic school defined in Paragraph (i) of Article 15-6 of Human Resources Development Promotion Law.

Varied names among prefectures

While there are 166 prefectural polytechnic schools all over Japan, they are named in different format as follows. The majority of those are called "xy college", while there are no regulating laws or regulations for colleges.

Polytechnic schools
By prefectures
: 
Aichi: Facilities at Okazaki, Ichinomiya, Yogyo (ceramic industry), Takahama, Higashi-mikawa
Aomori: Facilities at Aomori, Hirosaki 
Chiba: Facilities at Abiko, Asahi, Funabashi, Ichihara, Ichikawa, Tōgane. Shōgaisha (Disabled)
Ehime: Facilities at Imabari, Matsuyama, Niihama, Uwajima
Fukuoka: Facilities at Fukuoka City, Fukuoka Shōgaisha (Disabled), Kokura, Kotake, Kurume, Ōmuta, Tagawa, Tobata
Gifu: A facility at Minamikoma-gun called Kyōnan, with another with varied name "International TAKUMI Academy" at Minokamo
Hiroshima: Facilities at Hiroshima, Kure, Fukuyama, Miyoshi, Hiroshima Shōgaisha Nōryoku Kaihatsukō. 
Iwate: Facilities at Miyako, Ninohe, Senmaya. Sangyō Gijutsu Tanki Daigakkō at Mizusawa
Kagoshima: Facilities at Fukiage, Miyahojō, Aira, Kanoya, Kagoshima Shōgaisha Shokugyō Nōryoku Kaihatsukō (for disabled) 
Kumamoto: A facility at Kumamoto 
Kyōto: Facilities at Fukuchiyama, Higashiyama-ku (for pottery). Two facilities for disabled,  Jōyō Shōgaisha and Kyōto Shōgaisha (disabled) 
Miyagi: Facilities at Ishinomaki, Kesennuma, Ōsaki, Sendai, Shiroishi 
Nagasaki: A facility at Nagasaki 
Nara: Facilities at Shiki District, Nara
Ōita:  Facility at Ōita, Ōita
Okayama: Facilities at Nanbu, Hokubu, Hokubu Mimasaka Branch 
Saitama: Facilities in Chichibu, Kasukabe, Kawaguchi, Kawagoe, Kumagaya, Saitama and the headquarter in Ageo 
Shiga: Nicknamed techno college and facilities at Maibara (Maibara Techno College), Kusatsu (Kusatsu Techno College) 
Yamanashi:  facility at 

Other names

 – Fukui, Ibaraki, Wakayama
 – Kagawa, Kōchi Mie
 – Yamaguchi
 – nicknamed  in Hokkaidō and Hyōgo
 – Kanagawa
 – Shimane nicknamed Techno School
 – Ōsaka
 – Ōita
 – Chiba
 – Okinawa
 – Tottori,  at both Kurayoshi and Yonago 
 – Gunma, Ishikawa, Miyazaki, Tochigi nicknamed 
 – Aomori* – Fukushima, Gifu, Okinawa
 – Saga
 – Kanagawa nicknamed Kana Tech College
 – Akita, Nagano, Shizuoka (nicknamed Techno College)
 – Niigata, Tokushima
 – Toyama
 – Iwate, Saitama, Tochigi, Tōkyō, Yamagata
 – Yamagata
 – Shizuoka
 – Gifu

Polytechnic schools by municipalities

There is one municipality administered polytechnic school in 2009 (Heisei 21), Yokohama Central Polytechnic School in Yokohama City, Kanagawa prefecture.

Accredited private vocational training institutions

There are private institutions for vocational training and education throughout Japan, including the following.

 Instrument and Technical Polytechnic School – SANKO Control, SANKO Group Co., Ltd.
 Politechnic School Mokushō-juku (Vocational Training Corporations Mokushō-juku Vocational Education Association)
 Toyota Industrial Academy (Toyota)
 ONTEX Technical School (ONTEX INC)
 Japan Men's Beauty College (General Corporate Judicial Person Japan Men's Beauty Association)

Notes

Footnotes

See also
 Vocational education
 
 
 

Education in Japan